K3 Kan Het! is a series with the Flemish girlsband K3. In this series the girls are searching for adventures with their fans, where they make the wish of their fans come true. There were 2 seasons aired with 13 episodes each. The first episode was aired on 3 May 2014.

Plot 
Karen, Kristel and Josje make the wishes of the kids come true. In every episode they fill three wishes, one by Karen, one by Kristel and one by Josje. Mostly it is something with adventure like a helicopter flight or training dogs, but sometimes it's an easy wish like being famous for one day.

Cast 
Karen Damen
Kristel Verbeke
Josje Huisman
Voice-over = Kobe Van Herwegen

Crew 
Producer: Anja Van Mensel
Concept: Gert Verhulst and Hans Bourlon
Creative Producer: Sven Duym
Executive Producer: Tinne Liipens

References 
vtmkzoom
studio100fan

Belgian children's television shows
Dutch children's television series
Belgian music television shows
Dutch music television series
2014 Dutch television series debuts
2014 Belgian television series debuts
2015 Dutch television series endings
2015 Belgian television series endings